Reuven Pinchas Bulka  (June 6, 1944 – June 27, 2021) was a Canadian rabbi, writer, broadcaster, and activist. He was the spiritual leader of Congregation Machzikei Hadas in Ottawa from 1967, first as Rabbi and then as Rabbi Emeritus, and served as co-president of the Canadian Jewish Congress from 2007 to 2009. Bulka's work with Kind Canada led to recognition the third week of February in each and every year as "Kindness Week" in Canada.

Biography
Bulka was born to Rabbi Chaim Yaakov "Jacob" and Yehudis "Ida" (Alt) Bulka in London on D-Day, June 6, 1944. The family moved to the United States in 1946, where his father taught at Hebrew schools in Providence and Rockaway before becoming rabbi of a synagogue in The Bronx.

He received his rabbinic ordination from the Rabbi Jacob Joseph Rabbinical Seminary in 1965, and was granted a Bachelor of Arts degree in Philosophy from the City College of the City University of New York the same year. He briefly served as Associate Rabbi at Congregation K’hal Adas Yeshurn in The Bronx, before becoming Rabbi of Congregation Machzikei Hadas in Ottawa in 1967. He received M.A. and Ph.D. degrees from the University of Ottawa in 1969 and 1971 respectively, concentrating on the logotherapy of Viktor Frankl.

In January 2021, Rabbi Bulka announced he had been diagnosed with late stage cancer of the liver and pancreas, and would travel to New York to be closer to his family who resided in and around New York City. He died on June 27, 2021 at the age of 77. He was buried in Israel.

Work

Writing and broadcasting
Rabbi Bulka was the founder and editor of the Journal of Psychology and Judaism. He contributed scholarly and popular articles to various journals, including the Association of Mental Health Clergy Forum, Analecta Frankliana, Chronicle Review,  Humanitas, Journal of Ecumenical Studies, Journal of Halacha and Contemporary Society, Journal of Humanistic Psychology, Midstream and Pastoral Psychology, among others. Bulka was the author and/or editor of over 35 books.

He was also the host of the TV series, In Good Faith and hosted the weekly radio call-in program Sunday Night with Rabbi Bulka on CFRA in Ottawa, and was host of the weekly radio Jewish culture and music program JEW-BILATION on CJLL-FM. He was a regular columnist for the Ottawa Citizen'''s "Ask the Religion Experts" feature. 

Rabbi Bulka regularly appeared during nationally televised observations of Remembrance Day services at the National War Memorial.

Organizations
He was on the editorial boards of Tradition, SASSON Magazine, Journal of Religion and Health, International Forum for Logotherapy and Pastoral Psychology''. Among other leadership roles, he served as Chairman of the RCA Publications Committee, the Ottawa World Jewry Committee (formerly Ottawa Soviet Jewry Committee), Israel Bonds's Rabbinic Cabinet, the Canadian Christian-Jewish Consultation, Ottawa Kindness Week, and the Trillium Gift of Life Network, President of the International Rabbinic Forum of Keren Hayesod, founder of Clergy for a United Canada, and Honorary Chaplain of the Dominion Command of the Royal Canadian Legion. He was a member of the Interfaith Committee on Canadian Military Chaplaincy and was instrumental in restoring Jewish Chaplains to the Canadian Forces. As a part of this Committee he received a Command Commendation from the Chief of Military Personnel. He was a member of the board of Canadian Blood Services and chaired the Hospice Ottawa West campaign. Previously he chaired the Courage Campaign for the Ottawa Regional Cancer Foundation which raised $25 million for cancer care.

Bulka's work with Kind Canada led to the federal government designating the third week of February in each and every year as "Kindness Week" with the adoption of Bill S-223 during the 43rd Canadian Parliament.

As co-President of the Canadian Jewish Congress, Bulka called on the leadership of the Catholic Church in Canada to follow the lead of bishops in France, Belgium and Germany, among other countries, in denouncing the Holocaust denial and anti-Semitism of Bishop Richard Williamson and in reaffirming in no uncertain terms that such hateful views have no place in the Church.

Awards and honours
Bulka was a recipient of the 125th Anniversary of the Confederation of Canada Medal (January 1993) as well as the Beryl Plumptre Award of Excellence from the Kidney Foundation of Canada, Eastern Ontario Branch (1998). He was also awarded the Gilbert Greenberg Distinguished Service Award of the Ottawa Jewish Community (1999), the Mayor's Award for Community Service (1999), the Bronfman Medal from the Canadian Jewish Congress. He was named the honorary principal of SAR Academy in Riverdale, New York in February 2009.

In 2006 Rabbi Bulka was awarded an honorary Doctorate of Laws from Carleton University, and on February 18, 2010, he was awarded the Key to the City of Ottawa. He also received Queen Elizabeth II's Silver Jubilee Medal, Golden Jubilee Medal, and Diamond Jubilee Medal. He was appointed to the Order of Canada on June 28, 2013.

He was awarded the Canadian Forces Medallion for Distinguished Service for "inspiring sermons, venerable presence and meaningful messages to Canadians during the National Remembrance Day ceremonies from the steps of the National War Memorial, Ottawa, Ontario, over many years."

Controversy regarding views on homosexuality
Bulka's reception of an honorary doctorate from Carleton University generated protests from the University's Students' Association and others due to Bulka's past association with the National Association for Research & Therapy of Homosexuality, a group promoting the practice of conversion therapy, on whose Scientific Advisory Committee he sat in 2004.

Partial bibliography

 
 
 
  Translated in Russian (Daat, Moscow-Jerusalem, 2001).

References

External links
 Reuven P. Bulka fonds (R4259) at Library and Archives Canada

1944 births
2021 deaths
British emigrants to Canada
Jewish Canadian writers
Canadian Jewish Congress
Canadian health and wellness writers
Canadian Orthodox rabbis
Canadian people of English-Jewish descent
Canadian spiritual writers
City College of New York alumni
Members of the Order of Canada
Modern Orthodox rabbis
Writers from Ottawa
Canadian psychotherapists
Rabbi Jacob Joseph School alumni
University of Ottawa alumni
20th-century Canadian rabbis
21st-century Canadian rabbis